The ruisseau de la Martine (English: Martine stream) is a tributary of the northwest shore of the St. Lawrence River. This river flows in the municipality of Petite-Rivière-Saint-François, in the Charlevoix Regional County Municipality, in the region Capitale-Nationale, in the province of Quebec, in Canada.

This valley is served by rue Principale de Petite-Rivière-Saint-François, which runs along the Saint-Laurent river to the west of the mouth of the Martine stream and then goes up the latter valley and the river valley from Sault. The economic activities of this valley are concentrated on the bank of the river where recreational tourism activities (notably vacationing) are developed. In addition, the peaks and flanks of the surrounding mountains are used for recreational tourism activities, in particular the important alpine ski center of Massif of Charlevoix which is located very close to the south side of this river and whose flank the mountain for alpine skiing faces the river.

The surface of the Martine stream is generally frozen from the beginning of December until the end of March, except the eddy areas; however, safe traffic on the ice is generally from mid-December to mid-March. The water level of the river varies with the seasons and the precipitation; the spring flood occurs in March or April.

Geography 
The Martine stream rises at a bend in the river where there is the confluence of the Sault river (coming from the east) and a stream (coming from the north), in the municipality of Petite-Rivière-Saint-François. This source is located at:
  south of downtown Baie-Saint-Paul;
  west of the center of the village of Petite-Rivière-Saint-François;
  east of route 138 which is 5 to 6 kilometers away at this point on the St. Lawrence River.

The Martine stream flows onto the northwest shore of the St. Lawrence River, on the "Pointe de la Rivière" (peninsula) in the hamlet Maillard, in the municipality of Petite-Rivière-Saint-François. This confluence is located at:
  west of the northwest shore of the St. Lawrence River;
  north of the center of the village of Petite-Rivière-Saint-François;
  east of route 138;
  north of the hamlet of Grande-Pointe.

Toponymy 
The toponymic designation "Martine stream" was listed in 1976 to define the lower segment. This river is designated "Rivière du Sault" (today "Ruisseau de la Martine") by the cartographer Joseph Bouchette, on his topographic maps of 1815 and 1831. The acronym "Ruisseau du Sot" later becomes usage to designate this watercourse; this variant reflects the spelling used in Bouchette's time. It refers to a sault which is defined as a more or less significant slope break or a fall.

The toponym "Petite rivière Saint-François" was formalized on August 17, 1978 at the Place Names Bank of the Commission de toponymie du Québec.

References

See also 

 Charlevoix Regional County Municipality
 Petite-Rivière-Saint-François, a municipality
 Le Massif
 Rivière du Sault (Charlevoix)
 St. Lawrence River
 List of rivers of Quebec

Rivers of Capitale-Nationale
Charlevoix Regional County Municipality